The Conference USA Football Championship Game is an annual American football game that has determined the season champion of Conference USA (C-USA) since 2005.

History
The championship game from 2005–2021, showcased the C-USA East Division regular season champion against the West Division regular season champion. From the 2022 season, the game pits the number one (1) team in the season standings versus the number two (2) team. The game is typically played on the first Saturday of December. The 2018 edition of the game, sponsored by Globe Life, was played on December 1, 2018, and televised by CBSSN. Ryan LLC currently holds sponsorship rights to the game.

Seven of the nine current C-USA members have played in the Conference USA Football Championship Game. The overall series between both divisions is led 10–8 by the East Division.

While seven current C-USA members have played in the game, only five have won: Florida Atlantic, Rice, UAB and UTSA, and Western Kentucky of the current member schools. Of these five schools, only Western Kentucky will be a C-USA member in the 2023 season.

The C-USA Football Championship Game had been aired on ESPN or its affiliates since 2005, but the 2018 Championship Game was aired on CBSSN.

Results

Conference USA champions (1996–2004)
Before 2005, each member of the conference played in a round-robin scheduling to determine the champion of the conference. In this time period, Southern Miss won the most titles with four. During this time frame, the winner of the C-USA Championship customarily received a berth to play in the Liberty Bowl against a member of the SEC. If two teams tied for the best conference record, co-champions were declared.

Final rankings from AP Poll shown.

Conference USA Championship Game (2005–present)
Below are the results from all Conference USA Football Championship Games played. The winning team appears in bold font, on a background of their primary team color. Rankings are from the AP Poll released prior to the game.

Results by team

Current members

 FIU and UTEP have yet to make an appearance in a Conference USA Championship Game.
 Jacksonville State, Liberty, New Mexico State, and Sam Houston will join C-USA in July 2023. Jacksonville State and Sam Houston will not be eligible to appear in the title game until completing transitions from Division I FCS to FBS in 2024.
 Charlotte, Florida Atlantic, North Texas, Rice, UAB, and UTSA will leave C-USA in July 2023 for the American Athletic Conference.

Former members

 Charlotte, Memphis, Old Dominion, and Tulane did not make an appearance in a Conference USA Championship Game while members of the conference.

Game location
The team with the best overall conference win percentage will be the team that hosts the championship game. Six venues have hosted two title games—Houston's Robertson Stadium (since demolished, with TDECU Stadium standing at its former site), UCF's FBC Mortgage Stadium (both under its former name of Bright House Networks Stadium), Tulsa's Chapman Stadium, Western Kentucky's Houchens Stadium, Florida Atlantic's FAU Stadium, and UTSA's Alamodome

In most recent years, Marshall and Rice both finished with 7–1 records in conference play in 2013, and did not play one another in the regular season, the site was chosen based on the BCS rankings at that time on December 1. Although only 25 teams were explicitly ranked, the ranking formula could be used to determine the relative rankings of any two teams in the Football Bowl Subdivision. Since 2014, when the BCS was replaced with the College Football Playoff rankings (CFP), national rankings have been removed from the tiebreaker process.

Following the 2022 contest, the home team is 13–5 overall in C-USA football championship games.

Game records

Source:

Selection criteria

Division standings are based on each team's overall conference record. Often, two or more teams tie for the best record in their division and each team is recognized as a divisional co-champion. However, tiebreakers are used to determine who will represent the division in the championship game.

Two-team tie-breaker procedure
 Highest regular season winning percentage based on overall Conference USA play.
 If tied, head-to-head between tied teams.
 If still tied, team with highest CFP ranking.

''NOTE:  Although all division rivals meet during the season and NCAA overtime is played in case of a tie game, the CUSA has provisions in case a game ends in a tie under NCAA Rule 3–3–3 (c) and (d), Suspending the Game, or if the two tied teams did not play an official game because of weather. As such, CUSA rules still contain the remaining procedures if those circumstances were to happen.

Three or more-team procedure
(Once the tie has been reduced to two teams, go to the two-team tie-breaker format.)
 Highest regular season winning percentage based on overall CUSA play.
 If tied, head-to-head between tied teams.
 If still tied, highest winning percentage within division.
 If still tied, compare records against divisional opponents in descending order of finish.
 If still tied, compare records with common cross-divisional opponents.
 If still tied, compare records against cross-divisional opponents in descending order of finish.
 If still tied, team with highest CFP ranking.
 If still tied, the representative will be the team that has not participated in the championship game most recently.
 If at any point the tie is broken in a multiple team tie, the remaining teams will begin the process again at #2.

See also
 List of NCAA Division I FBS conference championship games

References